Nzoko Ignace "Iggy" Moleka is a retired Congolese association football midfielder who played professionally in the United States and Japan.

Playing career
In 1991, Moleka received a scholarship to play soccer at Florida International University. He left FIU at the end of the season. In 1993, he played for Topaz Haiti, a selection of top players from the Haitian league, in the Miami Copa Latina. In 1994, he played for the Haitian Internationals. He also played for the Florida Stars in the USISL. In 1994, Moleka returned to FIU to finish his collegiate career. In 1996, he was selected as a First Team All American while the Golden Panthers finished runner-up in the NCAA Men's Division I Soccer Championship.

In 1997, Moleka moved to Japan where he played for Albirex Niigata in the third division Hokushin'etsu. Moleka and his team mates won promotion to the second division Japanese Football League for the 1998 season. In the fall of 1999, Moleka returned to the United States where he played for the amateur Orlando Soccer Locker. Moleka signed with the Atlanta Silverbacks for the 1999 USL A-League season. He retired from playing in 2002, but remained with the Silverbacks where he has held a variety of positions including youth coach.

References

1978 births
Living people
Albirex Niigata players
Atlanta Silverbacks players
Democratic Republic of the Congo footballers
Democratic Republic of the Congo expatriate footballers
Expatriate footballers in Japan
Expatriate soccer players in the United States
FIU Panthers men's soccer players
Florida Stars players
USISL players
USL First Division players
All-American men's college soccer players
Association football forwards
21st-century Democratic Republic of the Congo people